Filip Chlapík (born 3 June 1997) is a Czech professional ice hockey forward. He is currently playing for HC Ambrì-Piotta in the National League (NL). Chlapík was selected 48th overall by the Ottawa Senators in the 2015 NHL Entry Draft.

Playing career
Chlapík was drafted by the Charlottetown Islanders in the 1st round (11th overall) of the 2014 CHL Import Draft. In his first season with Charlottetown he was recognized for his outstanding play when he was selected to take part in the 2015 CHL/NHL Top Prospects Game. He was also named to the 2014–15 QMJHL All-Rookie Team after tying for league lead in both rookie goal scoring (33) and power play goals (10).

Chlapík signed an entry level contract with the Ottawa Senators on 22 December 2016. Chlapík made his professional debut with the Belleville Senators, the American Hockey League (AHL) affiliate of the Ottawa Senators in October 2017. Chlapík was an injury callup to Ottawa later in October and made his NHL debut on 26 October 2017 in a 5–4 win against the Philadelphia Flyers, during which he scored his first NHL point.

Chlapík started the 2017–18 season with the Belleville Senators. He was called up to the NHL on 25 October 2017 and played one game before being sent back to the AHL on 28 October 2017. He was called up multiple times in December and January but was injured in a game against the Minnesota Wild and was sent down to the AHL shortly after. Chlapík was not called up again until 19 March 2018, and he recorded his first NHL goal on 22 March 2018, in a game against the Edmonton Oilers.

Entering his fourth season within the Senators organization and with the 2020–21 NHL season set to be delayed due to the ongoing COVID-19 pandemic, Chlapík was loaned by Ottawa to remain with his original hometown club, HC Sparta Praha, on 29 September 2020. He made 3 appearances in the Czech Extraliga, registering 1 goal before returning to the Ottawa Senators for the commencement of training camp. Remaining with the Senators roster, primarily assigned to the club's taxi squad, Chlapík featured in one game, going scoreless, before he was reassigned to Belleville. After two games in the AHL, on 27 February 2021, Chlapík was placed on unconditional waivers and was subsequently mutually released from the remainder of his contract with the Ottawa Senators.

As a free agent, Chlapík secured a contract for the remainder of the 2020–21 season with Finnish club, Lahti Pelicans of the Liiga, on 2 March 2021. He collected 2 goals and 6 points through 11 regular season games before making 5 playoff appearances.

On 11 May 2021, Chlapík familiarly made a full return to his original Czech club, HC Sparta Praha, agreeing to a two-year contract.

International play
Chlapík won silver medals with the Czech under-18 national team at both the 2014 IIHF World U18 Championships and 2014 Ivan Hlinka Memorial Tournament. He also competed at the 2015 IIHF World U18 Championships where the Czech national team was eliminated in the Quarterfinals.

Personal life
Chlapík is good friends with Daniel Sprong. Sprong was chosen just two picks ahead of Chlapík by the Pittsburgh Penguins.

His brother Adam Chlapík is also a hockey player.

Career statistics

Regular season and playoffs

International

Awards and honours

References

External links 

1997 births
Living people
HC Ambrì-Piotta players
Belleville Senators players
Czech ice hockey centres
Charlottetown Islanders players
Lahti Pelicans players
HC Stadion Litoměřice players
Ottawa Senators draft picks
Ottawa Senators players
HC Sparta Praha players
Ice hockey people from Prague
Czech expatriate ice hockey players in Canada
Czech expatriate ice hockey players in Finland
Czech expatriate ice hockey players in Switzerland